The fifth season of Dancing Brasil premiered on Wednesday, July 3, 2019, at 10:45 p.m. (BRT / AMT) on RecordTV.

On September 11, 2019, singer D'Black & Carol Dias won the competition with 38.21% of the public vote over olympic gymnast Dany Hypólito & Marquinhos Costa (32.23%) and artistic swimmer Bia Feres & Paulo Victor Souza (29.56%).

Cast

Couples

Scoring chart

Key
 
 
  Eliminated
  Risk zone
  Immunity
  Withdrew
  Third place
  Runner-up
  Winner

Weekly scores
Individual judges' scores in the charts below (given in parentheses) are listed in this order from left to right: Jaime Arôxa, Fernanda Chamma, Paulo Goulart Filho and Brazil

Week 1: First Dances 
The couples performed pasodoble, cha-cha-cha, rumba, samba, tango, foxtrot, quickstep, salsa, rumba or waltz.

Running order

Week 2: Life Moments 
The couples performed one unlearned dance to celebrate the most memorable moment of their lives. Jive is introduced.

Since Cátia Paganote suffered an injury during week 2's rehearsals, she and Fernando were unable to perform on this week's live show. As result, the couple was given a bye for the week.

Running order

Week 3: 50s Night 
Individual judges' scores in the charts below (given in parentheses) are listed in this order from left to right: Jaime Arôxa, Jarbas Homem de Mello, Paulo Goulart Filho and Brazil

The couples performed one unlearned dance to famous 50s songs.

Running order

Week 4: Pan American Games 
The couples performed one unlearned dance in order to promote the 2019 Pan American Games broadcast on RecordTV.

Since Maria Paula suffered an injury during week 4's rehearsals, she and Tutu were unable to perform on this week's live show. As result, the couple was given a bye for the week.

Running order

Week 5: Movie Night 
The couples performed one unlearned dance to famous film songs.

Since Alinne Prado suffered an injury during week 5's rehearsals, she and Jefferson were unable to perform on this week's live show. As result, the couple was given a bye for the week.

Running order

Week 6: Father's Night 
The couples performed one unlearned dance dedicated to their fathers in order to celebrate the Brazilian Father's Day on August 11, 2019.

Running order

Week 7: Couple's Choice 
The couples performed one unlearned dance of their choice. Contemporary, charleston, stiletto and hip-hop are introduced.

MC Koringa suffered an injury during week 7's rehearsals which he would be unable to recover in time for next week's live show. As a result, he and Bella had to withdraw from the competition.

Running order

Week 8: The Musicals 
The couples performed a group dance with a different partner for extra points.

Running order

The couples performed one unlearned musical theatre-inspired dance.

Running order

Week 9: Trio Night
The couples performed one unlearned trio dance involving an eliminated pro.

Running order

After the individual routines were performed, the bottom three couples (Bia & Paulo Victor, Dany & Marquinhos and Ricardo & Dani) competed in a tango dance-off, where Dany & Marquinhos received immunity and avoided elimination this week, while the remaining couples were placed in the Risk Zone. Ricardo & Dani received the fewest votes to save and were eliminated over Bia & Paulo Victor.

Week 10: Semifinals 
The couples performed their final two unlearned dances (a Latin dance and a ballroom dance).

Running order

Week 11: Finals
The couples performed a redemption dance and a showdance that fused three previously learned dance styles.

Running order

Dance chart 
 Week 1: One unlearned dance (First Dances)
 Week 2: One unlearned dance (Life Moments)
 Week 3: One unlearned dance (50s Night)
 Week 4: One unlearned dance (Pan American Games)
 Week 5: One unlearned dance (Movie Night)
 Week 6: One unlearned dance (Father's Night)
 Week 7: One unlearned dance (Couple's Choice)
 Week 8: One unlearned dance (The Musicals)
 Week 9: One unlearned dance (Trio Night)
 Week 10: Two unlearned dances (Semifinals)
 Week 11: Redemption dance and showdance (Finals)

Ratings and reception

Brazilian ratings
All numbers are in points and provided by Kantar Ibope Media.

References

External links 
 Dancing Brasil on R7.com

2019 Brazilian television seasons